Tecoma railway station is located on the Belgrave line in Victoria, Australia. It serves the eastern Melbourne suburb of Tecoma, and opened on 1 February 1924.

History
Tecoma station opened opened on 1 February 1924, on the narrow-gauge Ferntree Gully to Gembrook line, which was constructed as a means of transporting produce to and from the Dandenong Ranges area, and timber from sawmills in Gembrook. The station was named by the Victorian Railways, and was named after the plant Tecoma, which was grown in the area.

On 3 August 1953, a landslide occurred between Selby and Menzies Creek, which saw the closure of the line, and the station, on 30 April 1954. The sudden loss of the railway resulted in a groundswell of public pressure for the line to quickly reopen.

The formation of the Puffing Billy Preservation Society in 1955 saw services resume on the section of the line between Upper Ferntree Gully and Belgrave, including Tecoma. Operations continued until 23 February 1958, after which the line between Upper Ferntree Gully and Belgrave was converted to broad-gauge and electrified. On 19 February 1962, the station reopened.

The platform was used in a short cameo in the 2012 telemovie Underground: The Julian Assange Story, with Metlink signs and tactile tiles visible in the film.

The station has been the second-least-used station in metropolitan Melbourne since the 2015/2016 financial year, and saw 73,957 passenger movements in the twelve months between June 2018 and July 2019. That equates to just over 200 passengers using the station each day, on average.

Platforms and services
Tecoma has one platform. It is served by Belgrave line trains.

Platform 1:
  all stations and limited express services to Flinders Street; all stations services to Belgrave; all stations shuttle services to Ringwood

Transport links
Ventura Bus Lines operates two routes via Tecoma station, under contract to Public Transport Victoria:
 : Belgrave station – Oakleigh station
 : Belgrave station – Upwey station

References

External links
 
 Melway map at street-directory.com.au

Railway stations in Melbourne
Railway stations in Australia opened in 1924
Railway stations in the Shire of Yarra Ranges